Jane Harber is an Australian actress who is known from her role as Zara Perkich in the television series Offspring.

Career

Television
Harber's television roles have included Susie Money in the series Underbelly, Zdenka Milanovic in The Secret Life of Us, and Bianca Nugent in Neighbours. She also appeared in season 5, part 1, episode 152 of Blue Heelers, titled "Sisterly Love", which aired on 22 July 1997, playing a young girl called Chloe Bassetti.

In 2012, Harber starred as Cora Benson in the ABC comedy series A Moody Christmas. She reprised that role in The Moodys, a follow-up to A Moody Christmas.

In 2013, she regularly appeared in The Elegant Gentleman's Guide to Knife Fighting, a sketch comedy show for the ABC.

Harber appeared as a special guest in Episode 8 of the comedy program SlideShow on the Seven Network.

In 2014, she played Michele Bennett, a former girlfriend of INXS lead singer, Michael Hutchence, in the TV mini-series INXS: Never Tear Us Apart.

She is probably best known for her role as Zara Perkich in seven seasons (86 episodes) of Offspring.

In 2018, she was a team captain in the TV panel show Show Me the Movie!, the other captain being Joel Creasey.

Harber played Karen in the 2018 Netflix TV movie, Pretty Little Stalker  and, in 2020, she took a leading role in Nine Network crime show, Informer 3838.

Filmography

References

External links 
 

Australian soap opera actresses
Australian television actresses
Living people
20th-century Australian actresses
21st-century Australian actresses
Year of birth missing (living people)